Lieutenant General Sir Kenneth Morley Loch, KCIE, KBE, CB, MC, (18 September 1890 – 9 January 1961) was a Scottish soldier in the British Army and defence planner.

Early life and military career
Born on 18 September 1890, Loch was educated at Wellington College, Berkshire and the Royal Military Academy, Woolwich, and, upon passing out from the latter, received a commission as a second lieutenant into the Royal Artillery on 23 December 1910. He saw action during World War I at the retreat from Mons and the battles of the Marne and Aisne, all in 1914. Leaving the front lines in 1916 he became an instructor in gunnery at the School of Instruction for the Royal Horse Artillery and the Royal Field Artillery until he returned to front line service in the Italian Campaign of 1918. During the war Loch was twice mentioned in dispatches and received the Military Cross (MC).

Between the wars
Between the wars Loch remained in the army and attended the Staff College, Camberley from 1923 to 1924. His fellow students included numerous future general officers, such as Dudley Johnson, John Smyth, Arthur Wakely, Montagu Stopford, Arthur Percival, Douglas Henry Pratt, Robert Stone, John Halsted, Frederick Pile, Michael Gambier-Parry, Henry Wemyss, Robert Pargiter, Edmond Schreiber, Alastair MacDougall, Roderic Petre, Balfour Hutchison, Leslie Hill and Gordon Macready. He was involved in air defence preparations for Britain around the British Empire. From 1926 to 1929 he was a General Staff Officer Grade 2 (GSO2) to the Territorial Army (TA) Air Defence Formations, and from 1932 to 1935 an instructor at the Staff College, Quetta; GSO2 at the War Office, 1935–1937, and GSO1, Royal Air Force (RAF) Fighter Command, 1937–1938.

World War II
From the beginning of World War II until 1941, Loch was Director of Anti-Aircraft and Coastal Defence. He argued successfully against the use of chemical weapons in case of a German invasion of Britain (see Operation Sea Lion). After a three-year tour of inspection of anti-aircraft defences in the British Empire (a Special Employment), he became Master-General of Ordnance, India, from 1944 until his retirement in 1947. After retiring the service Loch was with the British Council from 1947 to 1948, then served as a member of the Control Commission for Germany, 1948–1949, and returned to the British Council from 1950 to 1958. He was also Chairman of Governors of Wellington College.

In 1929 Loch married Monica Joan Estelle Ruffer, the daughter of a German banker, and had three sons. He was also the uncle of the Labour Member of Parliament Tam Dalyell.

Bibliography

References

External links

Generals of World War II

Scottish generals
British Army generals of World War II
British Army personnel of World War I
1890 births
1961 deaths
Knights Commander of the Order of the Indian Empire
Knights Commander of the Order of the British Empire
Companions of the Order of the Bath
Recipients of the Military Cross
Royal Artillery officers
People educated at Wellington College, Berkshire
Chemical warfare
Graduates of the Staff College, Camberley
Graduates of the Royal Military Academy, Woolwich
British Army lieutenant generals